Stokes may refer to:

People
 Stokes (surname), a surname (including a list of people with the name)
 Governor Stokes (disambiguation)
 Senator Stokes (disambiguation)

Science
 Stokes (unit), a measure of viscosity
 Stokes boundary layer
 Stokes drift
 Stokes equation (disambiguation)
 Stokes flow
 Stokes' law
 Stokes' law of sound attenuation
 Stokes line
 Stokes number
 Stokes parameters
 Stokes radius
 Stokes relations
 Stokes shift
 Stokes stream function
 Stokes' theorem
 Stokes wave 
 Campbell–Stokes recorder
 Navier–Stokes equations

Places 
 Stokes Bay (disambiguation)
 Stokes Township (disambiguation)

Australia 
 Stokes, Queensland, a locality in the Shire of Carpentaria, Queensland
 Stokes County, Queensland
 Stokes National Park, in the Goldfields-Esperance region of Western Australia

Canada 
 Stokes Mountain, a mountain in Nunavut
 Stokes Range, a mountain range in Nunavut

New Zealand 
 Stokes Valley, a suburb of Lower Hutt
 Stokes State Forest, a state park in Sussex County

United States 
 Stokes, North Carolina
 Stokes County, North Carolina
 Stokes State Forest, Sussex County, New Jersey

In space 
 Stokes (lunar crater), Moon
 Stokes (Martian crater), Mars

Groups, companies, organizations
 Stokes Valley RFC, a rugby football club in Stokes Valley, New Zealand
 Frederick A. Stokes Company, a publisher owned by Frederick A. Stokes
 Stoke's, beers made by McCashin's Brewery, Nelson, New Zealand

Other uses
 USS Stokes (AKA-68), a US Navy cargo ship
 Stokes mortar, a weapon

See also

 Stokes House (disambiguation)
 
 Stoke (disambiguation)